The Poisoned Light is a 1921 Czechoslovak silent adventure film directed by Jan S. Kolár and Karel Lamač.

Cast
Karel Fiala as Inventor Oskar Grant
Anny Ondra as Grant's daughter Anny
Karel Lamač as Milan Bell
Jindřich Lhoták as Karel Selín
Emil Artur Longen as Illusionist Durk/Durk's brother
Jan S. Kolár as Ferdinand Karban
Přemysl Pražský as Martin Bálek
Antonín Marek as Servant/Baron Evans Margus
Josef Šváb-Malostranský as Servant Jan

Release
The film was restored and released in a DVD boxset with six other Kolár's silent films by Czech Film Archive in 2018.

References

External links 
 

1921 films
1920s adventure drama films
Czechoslovak black-and-white films
Czech silent films
Czech adventure drama films
Silent adventure drama films
1920s Czech-language films